Anoecia cornicola is a species of aphid in the subfamily Anoeciinae. It has been recorded as a pest of Sorghum bicolor, Setaria glauca, Setaria viridis, Echinochloa crus-galli, Zea mays, Eragrostis major, Digitaria sanguinalis, and Panicum capillare in the United States.

References

Aphididae
Insect pests of millets